Tauss is a surname. Notable people with the surname include:

Herbert Tauss (1929–2001), American artist, illustrator, and painter
Jörg Tauss (born 1953), German politician
Roger Tauss, Swiss slalom canoeist

See also
Tuss